Jersey Belle is an American reality television series, which premiered on August 4, 2014, on Bravo. Announced in April 2014, the docu-series chronicles the life of entertainment publicist Jaime Primak Sullivan as she moves to Birmingham, Alabama and tries to get used to Southern life among the city's wealthy.

Location 
Although the show claimed to take place in the wealthy Birmingham, Alabama enclave of Mountain Brook, none of the cast actually lived in Mountain Brook and very little of the town is featured in the series. Most of the show took place in Vestavia Hills, Crestline Heights, and Pelham. There were several cast members with ties to Mountain Brook.

Episodes

References

External links 

 
 
 

2010s American reality television series
2014 American television series debuts
2014 American television series endings
Bravo (American TV network) original programming
Television series by Authentic Entertainment
English-language television shows
Women in Alabama